Lydia Kathleen Jackson (born January 2, 1984) is an American soccer coach and retired player who played as a midfielder.

Coaching career
Vandenbergh worked as a coach for Matthews Soccer Club in Charlotte, North Carolina from 2006 to 2007. In 2008, she was an assistant coach at Charlotte Christian School, while also serving as a volunteer assistant coach for the Florida State Seminoles. From 2009 to 2010, she worked as an assistant for the Western Carolina Catamounts women's team, and in 2010 was an assistant coach for the Coastal Carolina Chanticleers. In 2012, Vandenbergh became an assistant coach for the Warren Wilson College women's soccer team under head coach Stacey Enos. She then became the associate head coach of the team in 2014, before being appointed as the head coach in 2015. She served as the coach for nine years while also working as an assistant athletic director, before stepping down from her roles in 2020.

Personal life
Vandenbergh grew up in Pisgah Forest, North Carolina, and graduated from Brevard High School in 2002. She graduated from Clemson University with a Bachelor of Science in computer science in 2006, and later from Georgia Southern University with a Master of Science in kinesiology. She lives in Swannanoa, North Carolina, with her husband Joshua Jackson.

References

External links
 
 Central Coast Mariners player profile
 Chicago Red Stars player profile
 Clemson player profile
 Western Carolina coaching profile
 Florida State coaching profile

1984 births
Living people
American women's soccer players
Central Coast Mariners FC (A-League Women) players
Chicago Red Stars players
Clemson Tigers women's soccer players
Saint Louis Athletica players
MagicJack (WPS) players
National Women's Soccer League players
Women's association football midfielders
Women's Professional Soccer players
Charlotte Lady Eagles players
Fortuna Hjørring players
Sydney FC (A-League Women) players
Santos FC (women) players
USL W-League (1995–2015) players
Elitedivisionen players
Women's Premier Soccer League players
American women's soccer coaches
Female association football managers
Florida State Seminoles women's soccer coaches
Western Carolina Catamounts coaches
Coastal Carolina Chanticleers coaches
Warren Wilson Owls coaches
American expatriate women's soccer players
American expatriate sportspeople in Brazil
American expatriate sportspeople in Australia
American expatriate sportspeople in Denmark
Expatriate women's footballers in Brazil
Expatriate women's soccer players in Australia
Expatriate women's footballers in Denmark